The Numina Application Framework is a product from Numina Solutions LLC which provides single sign-on capabilities and an Application framework for building applications.

Features
Features of the Numina Application Framework include :
 Authentication to LDAP, OpenID, and a local database.
 A SAML and OpenID Identity Provider
 Application, Authorization, and Access Control management
 Domain, Group, and User management
 Brute force prevention
 Password complexity, expiration, history, and strength meters
 Dashboard for accessing applications

Components
There are three main components of the Numina Application Framework:
 Front-End Application, for web authentications and system management.
 WCF Service, which provides information to the front-end application as well as applications utilizing the Application framework.
 Developer Tools, which provide wrappers for the WCF Service and other tools to build client applications.

See also
 Single sign-on
 Application framework
 Service-oriented architecture
 Enterprise software
 Identity management
 List of single sign-on implementations

External links
 Official web site

Computer security software
Computer access control
Enterprise architecture frameworks